The 2014 Cincinnati Reds season was the 125th season for the franchise in Major League Baseball and their 12th at Great American Ball Park. They finished 76–86, in fourth place in the Central division.

Standings

National League Central

National League

Record vs. opponents

Regular season

Detailed record

Most Runs Scored in a game: 14 (9/5 vs. NYM)
Most Runs Allowed in a game: 18 (9/5 vs. NYM)
Most Hits in a Game: 19 (6/15 vs. MIL)
Longest Winning Streak: 5 games (7/6–7/9)
Longest Losing Streak: 7 games (8/17–8/27)

Home attendance
(through September 27) Source: 2014 MLB Attendance Report

Game log

|- style="text-align:center; background:#fbb;"
| 1 || March 31 || Cardinals || FSO || L 0–1 || Wainwright (1–0) || Cueto (0–1) || Rosenthal (1) || 43,134 || 0–1 || 
|- style="text-align:center; background:#bfb;"
| 2 || April 2 || Cardinals || FSO || W 1–0 || Hoover (1–0) || Martinez (0–1) || || 36,189 || 1–1 || 
|- style="text-align:center; background:#fbb;"
| 3 || April 3 || Cardinals || FSO || L 6–7 || Lynn (1–0) || Bailey (0–1) || Rosenthal (2) || 16,857 || 1–2 || 
|- style="text-align:center; background:#fbb"
| 4 || April 4 || @ Mets || FSO || L 3–4 || Mejia (1–0) || Leake (0–1) || Valverde (1) || 35,845 || 1–3 || 
|- style="text-align:center; background:#fbb"
| 5 || April 5 || @ Mets || FSO || L 3–6 || Torres (1–0) || Hoover (1–1) ||  || 25,454 || 1–4 || 
|- style="text-align:center; background:#bfb"
| 6 || April 6 || @ Mets || FSO || W 2–1 || Simón (1–0) || Niese (0–1)  || Parra (1) || 26,928 || 2–4 || 
|- style="text-align:center; background:#fbb"
| 7 || April 7 || @ Cardinals || FSO || L 3–5 || Wacha (1–0) || Cingrani (0–1) || || 47,492 || 2–5 || 
|- style="text-align:center; background:#fbb"
| 8 || April 8 || @ Cardinals || FS1 || L 5–7 || Lynn (2–0) || Ondrusek (0–1) || Rosenthal (3) || 40,672 || 2–6 || 
|- style="text-align:center; background:#bfb"
| 9 || April 9 || @ Cardinals || FSO || W 4–0 || Leake (1–1) || Miller (0–2) || || 41,137 || 3–6 || 
|- style="text-align:center; background:#fbb"
| 10 || April 11 || Rays || FSO || L 1–2 || Price (2–0) || Cueto (0–2) || Balfour (3) || 30,502 || 3–7 || 
|- style="text-align:center; background:#fbb;"
| 11 || April 12 || Rays || FSO || L 0–1 || Cobb (1–1) || Simón (1–1) || Balfour (4) || 35,356 || 3–8 || 
|- style="text-align:center; background:#bfb"
| 12 || April 13 || Rays || FSO || W 12–4 || Cingrani (1–1) || Ramos (0–1) || || 34,307 || 4–8 || 
|- style="text-align:center; background:#fbb;"
| 13 || April 14 || Pirates || FSO || L 7–8 || Morris (2–0) || LeCure (0–1) || Grilli (4) || 17,756 || 4–9 || 
|- style="text-align:center; background:#bfb"
| 14 || April 15 || Pirates || FSO || W 7–5 || Leake (2–1) || Cole (2–1) || Broxton (1) || 18,462 || 5–9 || 
|- style="text-align:center; background:#bfb"
| 15 || April 16 || Pirates || FSO || W 4–0 || Cueto (1–2) || Liriano (0–3) ||  || 16,825 || 6–9 || 
|- style="text-align:center; background:#bfb"
| 16 || April 18 || @ Cubs || FSO || W 4–1 || Simón (2–1) || Samardzija (0–2) || Broxton (2) || 28,699 || 7–9 || 
|- style="text-align:center; background:#fbb;"
| 17 || April 19 ||  @ Cubs || FSO ||L 4–8 || Jackson (1–1) || Cingrani (1–2) ||  || 32,966 || 7–10 || 
|- style="text-align:center; background:#bfb"
| 18 || April 20 || @ Cubs || FSO || W 8–2 || Bailey (1–1) || Villanueva (1–4) ||  || 27,927 || 8–10 || 
|- style="text-align:center; background:#fbb;"
| 19 || April 21 || @ Pirates || FSO/ESPN || L 5–6 || Hughes (1–0) || Hoover (1–2) ||  || 12,864 || 8–11 || 
|- style="text-align:center; background:#bfb"
| 20 || April 22 || @ Pirates || FSO || W 4–1 || Cueto (2–2) || Vólquez (1–1) ||  || 11,926 || 9–11 || 
|- style="text-align:center; background:#bfb"
| 21 || April 23 || @ Pirates || FSO || W 5–2 || Simón (3–1) || Morton (0–3) || Broxton (3) || 16,705 || 10–11 || 
|- style="text-align:center; background:#bfb"
| 22 || April 24 || @ Pirates || FSO || W 2–1 || Cingrani (2–1) || Cumpton (0–1) || Broxton (4) || 18,896 || 11–11 || 
|- style="text-align:center; background:#fbb;"
| 23 || April 25 || @ Braves || FSO || L 5–6 || Santana (3–0) || Bailey (1–2) || Kimbrel (7) || 31,111 || 11–12 || 
|- style="text-align:center; background:#fbb;"
| 24 || April 26 || @ Braves || FSO || L 1–4 || Hale (1–0) || Leake (2–2) || Kimbrel (8) || 33,702 || 11–13 || 
|- style="text-align:center; background:#fbb;"
| 25 || April 27 || @ Braves || FSO || L 0–1 (10)|| Thomas (1–0) || Hoover (1–3) || || 31,446 || 11–14 || 
|- style="text-align:center; background:#bbb;"
| — || April 28 || Cubs || FSO || colspan=7| PPD, RAIN; rescheduled for July 8 as part of a day-night doubleheader
|- style="text-align:center; background:#bfb"
| 26 || April 29 || Cubs || FSO || W 3–2|| Simón (4–1) || Samardzija (0–3) || Broxton (5) || 17,579 || 12–14 ||  
|- style="text-align:center; background:#fbb;"
| 27 || April 30 || Cubs || FSO || L 4–9|| Jackson (2–2) || Christiani (0–1) || || 21,847 || 12–15 ||  
|-

|- style="text-align:center; background:#bfb;"
| 28 || May 1 || Brewers || FSO || W 8–3 || Bailey (2–2) || Henderson (2–1) ||  || 16,779 || 13–15 || 
|- style="text-align:center; background:#fbb;"
| 29 || May 2 || Brewers || FSO || L 0–2 || Peralta (4–1) || Leake (2–3) || Rodríguez (14) || 32,759 || 13–16 || 
|- style="text-align:center; background:#bfb;"
| 30 || May 3 || Brewers || FSO || W 6–2 || Cueto (3–2) || Gallardo (2–1) ||  || 38,243 || 14–16 ||  
|- style="text-align:center; background:#bfb;"
| 31 || May 4 || Brewers || FSO || W 4–3 (10) || LeCure (1–1) || Thornburg (3–1) ||  || 32,953 || 15–16 || 
|- style="text-align:center; background:#fbb;"
| 32 || May 6 || @ Red Sox || FSO || L 3–4 (12) || Breslow (1–0) || Ondrusek (0–2) ||  || 36,004 || 15–17 || 
|- style="text-align:center; background:#fbb;"
| 33 || May 7 || @ Red Sox || FSO || L 3–4 || Breslow (2–0) || Hoover (1–4) ||  || 37,072 || 15–18 ||  
|- style="text-align:center; background:#bfb;"
| 34 || May 9 || Rockies || FSO || W 4–3 || Broxton (1–0) || Logan (1–1) ||  || 27,187 || 16–18 ||  
|- style="text-align:center; background:#fbb;"
| 35 || May 10 || Rockies || FSO || L 2–11 || Lyles (5–0) || Simón (4–2) ||  || 37,984 || 16–19 || 
|- style="text-align:center; background:#bfb;"
| 36 || May 11 || Rockies || FSO || W 4–1 || Bailey (3–2) || Nicasio (4–2) || Chapman (1) || 33,143 || 17–19 || 
|- style="text-align:center; background:#fbb;"
| 37 || May 13 || Padres || FSO || L 1–2 || Benoit (1–0) || Chapman (0–1) || Street (12) || 23,269 || 17–20 || 
|- style="text-align:center; background:#bbb;"
| — || May 14 || Padres || colspan=8| PPD, RAIN; rescheduled for May 15 as part of a day-night doubleheader
|- style="text-align:center; background:#bfb;"
| 38 || May 15 || Padres || FS1 || W 5–0 ||Cueto (4–2) || Kennedy (2–5) || || 27,686 || 18–20 ||  
|- style="text-align:center; background:#fbb;"
| 39 || May 15 || Padres || FSO || L 1–6 || Ross (5–3) || Francis (0–1) || || 23,544 || 18–21 ||  
|- style="text-align:center; background:#bfb;"
| 40 || May 16 || @ Phillies || FSO || W 3–0 || Simón (5–2) || Kendrick (0–4) || Chapman (2) || 27,316 || 19–21 || 
|- style="text-align:center; background:#fbb;"
| 41 || May 17 || @ Phillies || FSO || L 1–12 || Hamels (1–2) || Bailey (3–3) ||  || 30,075 || 19–22 || 
|- style="text-align:center; background:#fbb;"
| 42 || May 18 || @ Phillies || FSO || L 3–8 || Lee (4–4) || Cingrani (2–3) ||  || 36,096 || 19–23 || 
|- style="text-align:center; background:#bfb;"
| 43 || May 19 || @ Nationals || FSO || W 4–3 (15) || Ondrusek (1–2) || Detwiler (0–2) || || 24,505 || 20–23 || 
|- style="text-align:center; background:#fbb;"
| 44 || May 20 || @ Nationals || FSO || L 4–9 || Fister (1–1) || Cueto (4–3) || || 26,455 || 20–24 || 
|- style="text-align:center; background:#bfb;"
| 45 || May 21 || @ Nationals || FSO || W 2–1 || Simón (6–2) || Roark (3–2) || Chapman (3) || 28,944 || 21–24 || 
|- style="text-align:center; background:#bfb;"
| 46 || May 23 || Cardinals || FSO || W 5–3 || Bailey (4–3) || Miller (6–3) || Chapman (4) || 37,271 || 22–24 || 
|- style="text-align:center; background:#fbb;"
| 47 || May 24 || Cardinals || Fox || L 3–6 || Garcia (1–0) || Cingrani (2–4) ||Rosenthal (15) || 41,585 || 22–25 || 
|- style="text-align:center; background:#fbb;"
| 48 || May 25 || Cardinals || ESPN || L 0–4 || Wainwright (8–2) || Leake (2–4) || || 42,273 || 22–26 || 
|- style="text-align:center; background:#fbb;"
| 49 || May 26 || @ Dodgers || FSO || L 3–4 || Ryu (5–2)  || Cueto (4–4) || Jansen (15) ||45,505 ||22–27|| 
|- style="text-align:center; background:#fbb;"
| 50 || May 27 || @ Dodgers ||FSO/ESPN || L 3–6 || Greinke (8–1) || Simón (6–3) || Jansen (16) ||45,505 ||22–28|| 
|- style="text-align:center; background:#bfb;"
| 51 || May 28 || @ Dodgers || FSO || W 3–2  || Bailey (5–3) || Kershaw (3–2) || Chapman (5) || 41,129 || 23–28 || 
|- style="text-align:center; background:#fbb;"
| 52 || May 29 || @ Diamondbacks || FSO || L 0–4 || Collmenter (4–2) || Cingrani (2–5) || || 18,457 ||23–29 || 
|- style="text-align:center; background:#bfb;"
| 53 || May 30 || @ Diamondbacks || FSO || W 6–4 || Leake (3–4) || Arroyo (4–4) || Chapman (6) || 19,826 ||24–29 || 
|- style="text-align:center; background:#bfb;"
| 54 || May 31 || @ Diamondbacks || FSO || W 5–0 || Cueto (5–4) || McCarthy (1–7) || || 23,765 || 25–29 || 
|-

|- style="text-align:center; background:#bfb;"
| 55 || June 1 ||  @ Diamondbacks || FSO || W 4–3 || Simón (7–3) || Miley (3–6) || Chapman (7) || 24,119 ||26–29 || 
|- style="text-align:center; background:#bfb;"
| 56 || June 3 || Giants || FSO || W 8–3 || Bailey (6–3) || Lincecum (4–4) || || 27,152 ||27–29 || 
|- style="text-align:center; background:#fbb;"
| 57 || June 4 || Giants || FSO || L 2–3 || Vogelsong (4–2) || Cingrani (2–6) || Romo (18) || 26,333 || 27–30 || 
|- style="text-align:center; background:#fbb;"
| 58 || June 5 || Giants || FSO ||L 1–6 || Bumgarner (8–3) || Leake (3–5) || || 25,532 || 27–31 ||   
|- style="text-align:center; background:#fbb;"
| 59 || June 6 || Phillies || FSO || L 8–0 || Hamels (2–3) || Cueto (5–5) || || 38,331 || 27–32 || 
|- style="text-align:center; background:#bfb;"
| 60 || June 7 || Phillies || FSO || W 6–5 || Simón (8–3) || Hernández(2–4) || Chapman (8) || 36,347 || 27–32 ||  
|- style="text-align:center; background:#bfb;"
| 61 || June 8 || Phillies || FSO || W 4–1 || Bailey (7–3) || Buchanan (1–3) || Chapman (9) || 30,222 || 29–32 || 
|- style="text-align:center; background:#fbb;"
| 62 || June 9 || Dodgers || FSO/ESPN || L 2–6 || Haren (6–4) || Cingrani (2–7)
|| || 31,915 || 29–33 || 
|- style="text-align:center; background:#fbb;"
| 63 || June 10 || Dodgers || FSO || L 1–6 || Beckett (4–3) || Leake (3–6) || || 27,692 || 29–34 || 
|- style="text-align:center; background:#bfb;"
| 64 || June 11 || Dodgers || FSO || W 5–0 || Cueto (6–5) || Ryu (7–3) || || 27,014 || 30–34 || 
|- style="text-align:center; background:#bfb;"
| 65 || June 12 || Dodgers || MLBN || W 4–1 || Simón (9–3) || Greinke (8–3) || Chapman (10) || 33,557 || 31–34 || 
|- style="text-align:center; background:#bfb;"
| 66 || June 13 || @ Brewers || FSO || W 6–5 || Broxton (2–0) || Rodríguez (2–2) || Chapman (11) || 38,330 || 32–34 || 
|- style="text-align:center; background:#fbb;"
| 67 || June 14 || @ Brewers || Fox || L 2–4 || Smith (1–0) || Hoover (1–5) || Rodríguez (21) || 40,507 || 32–35 || 
|- style="text-align:center; background:#bfb;"
| 68 || June 15 || @ Brewers || FSO || W 13–4 || Leake (3–5) || Estrada (5–4) || || 42,213 || 33–35 || 
|- style="text-align:center; background:#bfb;"
| 69 || June 17 || @ Pirates || FSO || W 6–5 || Ondrusek (2–2) || Grilli (0–2) || Chapman (12) || 23,565 || 34–35 || 
|- style="text-align:center; background:#bfb;"
| 70 || June 18 || @ Pirates || FSO || W 11–4 || Simón (10–3) || Vólquez (4–6) || || 23,329 || 35–35 || 
|- style="text-align:center; background:#fbb;"
| 71 || June 19 || @ Pirates || FSO || L 3–4 (12) || Wilson (2–0) || Cingrani (2–8)  || || 30,710 || 35–36 || 
|- style="text-align:center; background:#fbb;"
| 72 || June 20 || Blue Jays || FSO || L 9–14 || McGowan (4–2) || Chapman (0–2) || || 33,103 || 35–37 || 
|- style="text-align:center; background:#bfb;"
| 73 || June 21 || Blue Jays || FSO || W 11–1 || Leake (4–5) || Happ (0–2) || || 42,530 || 36–37 || 
|- style="text-align:center; background:#bfb;"
| 74 || June 22 || Blue Jays || FSO || W 4–3 || Cueto (7–5) || Dickey (6–6) || Chapman (13) || 36,089 || 37–37 || 
|- style="text-align:center; background:#bfb;"
| 75 || June 23 || @ Cubs || FSO || W 6–1 || Broxton (3–0)|| Rondón (1–2) || || 27,747 || 38–37 || 
|- style="text-align:center; background:#fbb;"
| 76 || June 24 || @ Cubs || FSO || L 3–7 || Arrieta (4–1)|| Bailey (7–4) || || 28,226 || 38–38 || 
|- style="text-align:center; background:#bfb;"
| 77 || June 25 || @ Cubs || FSO || W 4–1 || Latos (1–0)|| Jackson (5–8) || Chapman (14) || 28,207 || 39–38 || 
|- style="text-align:center; background:#bfb;"
| 78 || June 26 || @ Giants || FSO || W 3–1 || Leake (5–5)|| Vogelsong (5–4) || Chapman (15) || 41,156 || 40–38 || 
|- style="text-align:center; background:#bfb;"
| 79 || June 27 || @ Giants || FSO || W 6–2 || Cueto (8–5)|| Bumgarner (9–5) || Chapman (16) || 41,046 || 41–38 || 
|- style="text-align:center; background:#bfb;"
| 80 || June 28 || @ Giants || FSO || W 7–3 (11)|| Broxton (4–0)|| López (1–1) || || 41,024 || 42–38 || 
|- style="text-align:center; background:#bfb;"
| 81 || June 29 ||  @ Giants || FSO || W 4–0 || Bailey (8–4)|| Hudson (7–5) || || 41,541 || 43–38 || 
|- style="text-align:center; background:#fbb;"
| 82 || June 30 || @ Padres || FSO || L 0–1 || Hahn (4–1)|| Latos (1–1) || Street (22) || 19,079 || 43–39 || 
|-

|- style="text-align:center; background:#fbb;"
| 83 || July 1 || @ Padres || FSO || L 2–8 || Kennedy (6–9)|| Leake (6–7) || || 20,312 || 43–40 || 
|- style="text-align:center; background:#fbb;"
| 84 || July 2 || @ Padres || FSO || L 0–3 || Ross (7–8)|| Cueto (8–6) || || 19,250 || 43–41 || 
|- style="text-align:center; background:#bfb;"
| 85 || July 4 || Brewers || FSO || W 4–2 || Simón (11–3)|| Lohse (9–3) || Chapman (17) || 42,120 || 44–41 || 
|- style="text-align:center; background:#fbb;"
| 86 || July 5 || Brewers || FSO || L 0–1 || Garza (6–5)|| Bailey (8–5) || || 38,754 || 44–42 || 
|- style="text-align:center; background:#bfb;"
| 87 || July 6 || Brewers || FSO || W 4–2 || Latos (2–1) || Smith (1–2) || Broxton (6) || 27,923 || 45–42 || 
|- style="text-align:center; background:#bfb;"
| 88 || July 7 || Cubs || FSO || W 9–3 || Leake (7–7) || Jackson (5–9) ||  || 26,588 || 46–42 || 
|- style="text-align:center; background:#bfb;"
| 89 || July 8 || Cubs ||   || W 4–2 || Cueto (9–6) || Wood (7–7)|| Chapman (18) || 17,371 || 47–42 || 
|- style="text-align:center; background:#bfb;"
| 90 || July 8 || Cubs || FSO || W 6–5 || Ondrusek (3–2) || Rondón (1–3) || || 29,991 || 48–42 || 
|- style="text-align:center; background:#bfb;"
| 91 || July 9 || Cubs || FSO || W 4–1 || Simón (12–3)|| Beeler (0–2)|| Chapman (19) || 32,810 || 49–42 || 
|- style="text-align:center; background:#fbb;"
| 92 || July 10 || Cubs ||    || L 4–6 (12)|| Parker (1–0)||Hoover (1–6)) || || 31,983 || 49–43 || 
|- style="text-align:center; background:#bfb;"
| 93 || July 11 || Pirates || FSO || W 6–5 || Partch (1–0)|| Watson (5–1)|| Chapman (20) || 36,317 || 50–43 || 
|- style="text-align:center; background:#fbb;"
| 94 || July 12 || Pirates || Fox || L 5–6 (11)|| Wilson (3–1)|| Hoover (1–7) || Gómez (1) || 42,789 || 50–44 || 
|- style="text-align:center; background:#bfb;"
| 95 || July 13 || Pirates || FSO || W 6–3 || Cueto (10–6)|| Liriano (5–1)|| Chapman (21) || 35,022 || 51–44 || 
|- style="text-align:center;"
| colspan="11" style="background:#bbcaff;"|July 15: 2014 MLB All-Star Game – Minneapolis, Minnesota at Target Field 
|- style="text-align:center; background:#fbb;"
| 96 || July 18 || @ Yankees || FSO || L 3–4 || Phelps (4–4)|| Leake (7–8) || Robertson (24) || 47,372 || 51–45 || 
|- style="text-align:center; background:#fbb;"
| 97 || July 19 || @ Yankees || FSO || L 1–7 || McCarthy (4–10)|| Simón (12–4)|| || 47,606 || 51–46 || 
|- style="text-align:center; background:#fbb;"
| 98 || July 20 || @ Yankees || FSO || L 3–4 || Robertson (1–2)|| Chapman (0–3)|| || 43,115 || 51–47 || 
|- style="text-align:center; background:#fbb;"
| 99 || July 21 || @ Brewers || FSO || L 2–5 || Peralta (4–1) || Latos (2–2) || Rodríguez (29) || 31,350 || 51–48 || 
|- style="text-align:center; background:#fbb;"
| 100 || July 22 || @ Brewers|| FSO || L 3–4 || Rodríguez (4–3) || LeCure (1–2) ||  || 33,485 || 51–49 || 
|- style="text-align:center; background:#fbb;"
| 101 || July 23 || @ Brewers || FSO || L 1–5 || Lohse (11–4) || Leake (7–9) ||  || 38,192 || 51–50 || 
|- style="text-align:center; background:#fbb;"
| 102 || July 25 || Nationals || FSO || L 1–4 || Roark (10–6) || Simón (12–5) || Soriano (24) || 38,812  || 51–51 || 
|- style="text-align:center;background:#bfb;"
| 103 || July 26 || Nationals || FSO/FS1 || W 1–0 || Cueto (11–6) || González (6–6) || Chapman (22) || 32,999 || 52–51 || 
|- style="text-align:center; background:#fbb;"
| 104 || July 27 || Nationals || FSO || L 2–4 || Fister (10–2) || Latos (2–3) || Soriano (25) || 31,982  || 52–52 || 
|- style="text-align:center; background:#fbb;"
| 105 || July 28 || Diamondbacks || FSO || L 1–2 (15)|| Pérez (1–1) || Hoover (1–8) || Reed (25) || 30,288 || 52–53 || 
|- style="text-align:center;background:#bfb;"
| 106 || July 29 || Diamondbacks || FSO || W 3–0 || Leake (8–9) || Cahill (1–8) || Chapman (23) || 33,153 || 53–53 || 
|- style="text-align:center; background:#fbb;"
| 107 || July 30 || Diamondbacks || MLBN || L 4–5 || Miley (7–7) || Simón (12–6) || Reed (26) || 26,332 || 53–54 || 
|- style="text-align:center;background:#bfb;"
| 108 || July 31 || @ Marlins || FSO || W 3–1 || Cueto (12–6) || Koehler (7–8) || Chapman (24) || 18,056 || 54–54 || 
|-

|- style="text-align:center;background:#bfb;"
| 109 || August 1 || @ Marlins || FSO || W 5–2 || Latos (3–3) || Cosart (9–8) || Chapman (25) || 20,410 || 55–54 || 
|- style="text-align:center; background:#fbb;"
| 110 || August 2 || @ Marlins || FSO || L 1–2 (10)|| Dunn (9–5) || LeCure (1–3) || || 25,159 || 55–55 || 
|- style="text-align:center;background:#bfb;"
| 111 || August 3 || @ Marlins || FSO || W 7–3 || Leake (9–9) || Turner (4–7) || || 26,707 || 56–55 || 
|- style="text-align:center; background:#fbb;"
| 112 || August 4 || @ Indians || FSO || L 1–7 || Kluber (12–6) || Simón (12–7) || Axford (10) || 18,696 || 56–56 || 
|- style="text-align:center; background:#bfb;"
| 113 || August 5 || @ Indians || FSO || W 9–2 || Cueto (13–6) || Tomlin (5–8) || || 22,068 || 57–56 || 
|- style="text-align:center; background:#bfb;"
| 114 || August 6 || Indians || FSO || W 8–2 || Latos (4–3) || Salazar (4–5) || || 33,863 || 58–56 || 
|- style="text-align:center; background:#bfb;"
| 115 || August 7 || Indians || FSO || W 4–0 || Bailey (8–5) || House (1–3) || || 31,862 || 59–56 || 
|- style="text-align:center; background:#fbb;"
| 116 || August 8 || Marlins || FSO || L 1–2 || Eovaldi (6–6) || Leake (9–10) || Cishek (28) || 31,193 || 59–57 || 
|- style="text-align:center; background:#fbb;"
| 117 || August 9 || Marlins || FSO || L 3–4 || Penny (1–0) || LeCure (1–4) || Cishek (29) || 34,768 || 59–58 || 
|- style="text-align:center; background:#bfb;"
| 118 || August 10 || Marlins || FSO || W 7–2 || Cueto (14–6) || Hand (2–4) || || 36,122 || 60–58 || 
|- style="text-align:center; background:#fbb;"
| 119 || August 12 || Red Sox || FSO || L 2–3 || Layne (1–0) || Broxton (4–1) || Uehara (26) || 35,903 || 60–59 || 
|- style="text-align:center; background:#fbb;"
| 120 || August 13 || Red Sox || FSO || L 4-5 || Ranaudo (2–0) || Leake (9–11) || Mujica (3) || 32,870 || 60–60 || 
|- style="text-align:center; background:#fbb;"
| 121 || August 14 || @ Rockies || FSO || L 3-7 || de la Rosa (12–8) || Simón (12–8) || || 32,538 || 60–61 || 
|- style="text-align:center; background:#bfb;"
| 122 || August 15 || @ Rockies || FSO || W 3-2 || Cueto (15–6) || Ottavino (0–4) || Chapman (26) || 33,668 || 61–61 || 
|- style="text-align:center; background:#bbb;"
| –– || August 16 || @ Rockies ||   || colspan=7| PPD, Water Main Break; rescheduled for August 17 as part of a day-night doubleheader
|- style="text-align:center; background:#fbb;"
| 123 || August 17 || @ Rockies || FSO || L 9-10 || Brothers (4-5) || Hoover (1-9) || || 42,310 || 61–62 || 
|- style="text-align:center; background:#fbb;"
| 124 || August 17 || @ Rockies || FSO || L 5-10 || Ottavino (1-4) || Contreras (0-1) || || 33,604 || 61–63 || 
|- style="text-align:center; background:#fbb;"
| 125 || August 18 || @ Cardinals || FSO || L 4–5 (10)|| Greenwood (2-1) || Ondrusek (3–3) || || 42,973 || 61–64 || 
|- style="text-align:center; background:#fbb;"
| 126 || August 19 || @ Cardinals || FSO || L 4–5 || Neshek (6-0) || Hoover (1-10) || || 42,573 || 61–65 || 
|- style="text-align:center; background:#fbb;"
| 127 || August 20 || @ Cardinals || FSO || L 2–7 || Lynn (14-8) || Cueto (15–7) || Rosenthal (37) || 43,085 || 61–66 || 
|- style="text-align:center; background:#fbb;"
| 128 || August 21 || Braves || FSO || L 0–8 || Teherán (14-8) || Holmberg (0–1) ||  || 20,243 || 61–67 || 
|- style="text-align:center; background:#fbb;"
| 129 || August 22 || Braves || FSO || L 1–3 (12) || Hale (4–4) || Parra (0–1) || Kimbrel (38) || 31,160 || 61–68 || 
|- style="text-align:center; background:#bfb;"
| 130 || August 23 || Braves || FS1 || W 1–0 || Leake (10–11) || Santana (13–7) || Chapman (27) || 41,502 || 62–68 || 
|- style="text-align:center; background:#bfb;"
| 131 || August 24 || Braves || FSO || W 5–3 || Simón (13–8) || Harang (10–8) || Broxton (7) || 29,642 || 63–68 || 
|- style="text-align:center; background:#fbb;"
| 132 || August 26 || Cubs || FSO || L 0–3 || Wood (8–11) || Cueto (15–8) || Rondón (22) || 19,481 || 63–69 || 
|- style="text-align:center; background:#bfb;"
| 133 || August 27 || Cubs || FSO || W 7–5 || Latos (5–3) || Turner (4–8) || Chapman (28) || 20,497 || 64–69 || 
|- style="text-align:center; background:#bfb;"
| 134 || August 28 || Cubs ||    || W 7–2 || Axelrod (5–3) || Arrieta (4–8) || || 21,316 || 65–69 || 
|- style="text-align:center; background:#fbb;"
| 135 || August 29 || @ Pirates || FSO || L 1–2 || Watson (10–1) || Broxton (4–2) || Melancon (25) || 37,209 || 65–70 || 
|- style="text-align:center; background:#fbb;"
| 136 || August 30 || @ Pirates || FSO/FS1 || L 2–3 || Worley (6–4) || Simón (13–9) || Melancon (26) || 38,023 || 65–71 || 
|- style="text-align:center; background:#bfb;"
| 137 || August 31 || @ Pirates || FSO || W 3–2 || Cueto (16–8) || Hughes (6–5) || Chapman (29) || 37,591 || 66–71 || 
|-

|- style="text-align:center; background:#fbb;"
| 138 || September 2 || @ Orioles || FSO || L 4-5 || Norris (12–8) || Latos (5–4) || Britton (32) || 15,021 || 66–72 || 
|- style="text-align:center; background:#fbb;"
| 139 || September 3 || @ Orioles || FSO ||L 0–6 || González (8–7) || Axelrod (1–1) || || 20,246 || 66–73 || 
|- style="text-align:center; background:#fbb;"
| 140 || September 4 || @ Orioles || FSO || L 7–9 || Hunter (3–2) || Parra (0–2) || Britton (33) || 21,114 || 66-74 || 
|- style="text-align:center; background:#fbb;"
| 141 || September 5 || Mets || FSO || L 5–14 || Colón (13–11) || Simón (13–10) || || 29,089 || 66-75 || 
|- style="text-align:center; background:#bfb;"
| 142 || September 6 || Mets || FSO || W 2–1 || Cueto (17–8) || Gee (13–10) || Chapman (30) || 33,672 || 67-75 || 
|- style="text-align:center; background:#fbb;"
| 143 || September 7 || Mets ||    || L 3–4 || Wheeler (10–9) || Latos (5–5) || Mejía (24) || 31,444 || 67-76 || 
|- style="text-align:center; background:#fbb;"
| 144 || September 8 || Cardinals || FSO || L 0–5 || Miller (9–9) || Parra (0–3) || || 27,612 || 67-77 || 
|- style="text-align:center; background:#bfb;"
| 145 || September 9 || Cardinals || FSO || W 9–5 || Leake (10–11) || Wacha (5–6)|| Chapman (31) || 25,742 || 68-77 || 
|- style="text-align:center; background:#bfb;"
| 146 || September 10 || Cardinals || FSO || W 4–2 || Simón (14–10) || Lyons (0–4)|| Chapman (32) || 26,631 || 69-77 || 
|- style="text-align:center; background:#bfb;"
| 147 || September 11 || Cardinals || FSO || W 1–0 || Cueto (18–8) || Lynn (15–9)|| Chapman (33) || 21,688 || 70-77 || 
|- style="text-align:center; background:#fbb;"
| 148 || September 12 || @ Brewers || FSO || L 3–2 || Rodríguez (5–5) || Díaz (0–1) ||  || 31,463 || 70-78 || 
|- style="text-align:center; background:#bfb;"
| 149 || September 13 || @ Brewers || FSO || W 5–1 || Holmberg (1–1) || Gallardo (8–10) ||  || 45,205 || 71–78|| 
|- style="text-align:center; background:#fbb;"
| 150 || September 14 || @ Brewers || FSO || L 2-9 || Garza (8–8) || Leake (11–12) ||  || 41,870 || 71–79|| 
|- style="text-align:center; background:#fbb;"
| 151 || September 15 || @ Cubs || FSO || L 0-1 || Rondón (4–4) || Villarreal (0–1) || || 33,144 || 71–80 || 
|- style="text-align:center; background:#fbb;"
| 152 || September 16 || @ Cubs || FSO || L 0–7 || Arrieta (9–5) || Cueto (18–5) || ||33,812 || 71–81 || 
|- style="text-align:center; background:#fbb;"
| 153 || September 17 || @ Cubs || FSO || L 1–3 || Hendricks (7–2) || Corcino (0–1) || Rondón (25) || 33,500 || 71–82 || 
|- style="text-align:center; background:#fbb;"
| 154 || September 19 ||  @ Cardinals || FSO || L 1–2 || Lackey (14–9) || Holmberg (1–2) || Maness (3) || 45,074 || 71–83 || 
|- style="text-align:center; background:#fbb;"
| 155 || September 20 ||  @ Cardinals || FS1 || L 4–8 || Motte (1–0) || Leake (11–13) || || 46,157 || 71–84 || 
|- style="text-align:center; background:#bfb;"
| 156 || September 21 ||  @ Cardinals || ESPN || W 7-2 || Simón (15-10) || Lynn (15-10) || || 45,747 || 72–84 || 
|- style="text-align:center; background:#bfb;"
| 157 || September 23 || Brewers || FSO || W 3-1 || Cueto (19–9) || Fiers (6–4) || Chapman (34) || 27,307 || 73–84 || 
|- style="text-align:center; background:#fbb;"
| 158 || September 24 || Brewers || FSO || L 0-5 || Lohse (13–9) || Corcino (0–2) || || 27,307 || 73–85 || 
|- style="text-align:center; background:#bfb;"
| 159 || September 25 || Brewers ||  || W 3–5 || Holmberg (2–2) || Gallardo (8–11) || Chapman (35) || 25,824 || 74–85 || 
|- style="text-align:center; background:#fbb;"
| 160 || September 26 || Pirates || FSO || L 1–3 || Hughes (7–5) || Villarreal (0–2) || Melancon (33) || 35,611 || 74–86 || 
|- style="text-align:center; background:#bfb;"
| 161 || September 27 || Pirates || FS1 || W 10–6 (10) || Axelrod (2–1) || Axford (2–4) ||  || 35,268 || 75–86 || 
|- style="text-align:center; background:#bfb;"
| 162 || September 28 || Pirates || FSO || W 4–1 || Cueto (20–9) || Watson (10–2) || Chapman (36) || 34,424 || 76–86 || 
|-

|

Roster

Opening day lineup

Player statistics
.
Both tables are sortable.

Batting
Note: G = Games played; AB = At bats; R = Runs scored; H = Hits; 2B = Doubles; 3B = Triples; HR = Home runs; RBI = Runs batted in; AVG = Batting average; SB = Stolen bases

Complete batting stats can be found here

Pitching
Note: W = Wins; L = Losses; ERA = Earned run average; G = Games pitched; GS = Games started; SV = Saves; IP = Innings pitched; H = Hits allowed; ER = Earned runs allowed; BB = Walks allowed; K = Strikeouts  

Complete pitching stats can be found here

Farm system

Minor League Baseball standings
LEAGUE CHAMPIONS: Billings

References

External links

 2014 Cincinnati Reds at Baseball Reference
 Official Website

Cincinnati Reds seasons
Cincinnati Reds
Cincinnati Reds